Forgotten Voices of the Holocaust is a collection of interviews with victims of the Holocaust as well as people who collaborated with or worked directly for the Nazi regime.  The Imperial War Museum commissioned Lyn Smith to work with them on their sound archive.  The interviews she brought together are now part of their permanent Holocaust exhibit as well as being set down in this book from Ebury Press.

The book is written by Smith, who puts the interviews into chronological order and gives context to the events surrounding them.  It also features a foreword by Laurence Rees.

External links
 Forgotten Voices website
 Imperial War Museum

2006 non-fiction books
Oral history books
Personal accounts of the Holocaust
Books of interviews
British non-fiction books
Ebury Publishing books